Tomás Burke (fl. 1600–02) was an Irish gentleman and soldier who served during the Nine Years' War.

Career
The most obscure of the four known sons of John na Seamar Burke (died 1583), Burke and his brothers - Redmond Burke, Baron Leitrim,  William Burke, Lord of Bealatury and John Óge Burke - fought with Hugh O'Neill, 2nd Earl of Tyrone and Aodh Ruadh Ó Domhnaill against the English during the Nine Years' War (Ireland). He survived the Siege of Kinsale but is believed to have perished while marching with Donal Cam O'Sullivan Beare. His brother, William, is the only member of the family referred to when the marchers' reached Aughrim, County Galway.

See also
House of Burke
Earl of Clanricarde

References

External links
 http://www.ucc.ie/celt/published/T100005F/

Irish soldiers in the Spanish Army
16th-century Irish people
People from County Galway
Tomas
People of Elizabethan Ireland